Henare Matua (c.1838–1894) was a New Zealand tribal leader, reformer and politician. Of Māori descent, he identified with the Ngati Kahungunu iwi. He was born in Nukutaurua, Hawke's Bay, New Zealand.

He was seen by some as the "Government candidate" and a leader of the "Repudiation" faction.

References

1894 deaths
Ngāti Kahungunu people
Māori politicians
1830s births
19th-century New Zealand politicians